Ural Philharmonic Orchestra (in Russian 'Уральский академический филармонический оркестр, УАФО') is a professional symphony orchestra based in Yekaterinburg, Russia. The Ural Philharmonic Orchestra was founded in 1936 by the Russian conductor Mark Paverman as the Orchestra of the Sverdlovsk Radio. The most prominent musicians of the Soviet Union – conductors, soloists and composers – worked with the Orchestra. However, due to the special status of the 'closed city' of Sverdlovsk it was 'hidden' from the rest of the world until 1991 when the city was 'opened', and the Orchestra's professional level quickly became known abroad.

Overview 
Based in Yekaterinburg, a 1,5 million city on the border between Europe and Asia, the Ural Philharmonic Orchestra performs over 100 concerts and more than 70 programs per year, both at its domicile, the Sverdlovsk Philharmonic Hall, and on its extensive international tours. Thanks to the Philharmonic’s innovative Digital Concert Hall capacities, the Orchestra’s home concerts are regularly broadcast live on video into the region's public libraries and cultural centres, where music lovers from the Sverdlovsk region can come together to share the experience.

The orchestra uniting a hundred musicians and directed by Dmitry Liss is famous for its flexibility and interpretations of classical and contemporary music. The Ural Philharmonic Orchestra is the main resident orchestra of all the musical festivals of the Sverdlovsk State Philharmonic. 

UPO has toured over 20 countries and performed at such venues as the Pleyel, Arsenal, Debussy Hall, Corum Opera Berlioz, Palais des congrès de Paris (France), Berlin Philharmonic, Essen Philharmonic (Germany), Konzerthaus, Vienna, Brucknerhaus Linz (Austria), Royal Concertgebouw (the Netherlands), Auditorio de Murcia (Spain), Beethovenhalle (Germany), Tokyo Bunka Kaikan, Tokyo International Forum, Tokyo Metropolitan Theater (Japan), Culture and Congress Center (Switzerland), John F. Kennedy Center for the Performing Arts (USA), Tonhalle and Victoria Hall (Switzerland), Queen Elizabeth Hall (Belgium), Grand Hall of the Moscow Conservatory, Great Hall of the St. Petersburg Philharmonic, Concert Hall and New Stage of the Mariinsky Theater (Russia), and others.

The Ural Philharmonic Orchestra discography comprises over 30 CDs. Its Russian Light album (Sony Classical, 2018) with Olga Peretyatko (soprano) received the OPUS Klassik Award and got nominated for the International Classical Music Awards (ICMA). 

Ural Philharmonic Orchestra collaborated with outstanding Russian and foreign musicians, including conductors Dmitry Kitaenko, Gennady Rozhdestvensky, Krzysztof Penderecki, Leif Segerstam, Mikhail Pletnev, Vladimir Fedoseev, Alexander Lazarev, Valery Gergiev, Klaus Tennstedt, Jean-Claude Casadesus, Inoue Michiyoshi, Hans Jorg Albrecht, Fabio Mastrangelo, Eliahu Inbal, Andrey Boreiko, Guintaras Rinkevisius, Dimitris Botinis and soloists Mstislav Rostropovich, Dmitri Hvorostovsky, Nikolai Petrov, Yuri Bashmet, Viktor Tretyakov, Elisso Virsaladze, Natalia Gutman, Liana Isakadze, Alexander Knyazev, Boris Andrianov, Peter Donohoe, Olga Borodina, Alena Baeva, Benjamin Grosvenor, Victor Julien-Laferrière, Henri Demarquette, Olga Peretyatko, Behzod Abduraimov, Boris Berezovsky, Vadim Repin, Nikolai Lugansky, Denis Matsuev, Frederic Kempf, Sergey Krylov, Olga Peretyatko, Branford Marsalis, Dmitry Masleev, Vadym Kholodenko, and other distinguished artists. 

The Ural Philharmonic Orchestra has a rich experience in performing contemporary music. The Orchestra regularly commissions works from acclaimed contemporary composers. In different years UPO collaborated with Toshio Hosokawa, Ivan Fedele, Alexander Tchaikovsky, Leonid Desyatnikov, René Koering, Eun-Hwa Cho, Anton Batagov, and Olga Viktorova.  The orchestra’s repertoire has included works by Yury Falik, Sofia Gubaidulina, Valentin Silvestrov, Avet Terteryan, Arvo Pyart, Galina Ustvolskaya, Nikolay Myaskovsky, Olivier Messiaen, Kaija Saariaho, Krzysztof Penderecki, Gia Kancheli, Rodion Schedrin, Alfred Schnittke, Philip Glass, John Adams, Gabriel Prokofiev. 
The UPO’s contemporary music recordings include those of Nikolai Myaskovsky, Galina Ustvolskaya, Avet Terteryan symphonies and Gabriel Prokofiev’s concertos (2019/2020 release).   

The Orchestra participated in numerous international festivals such as the Music Biennale Zagreb, the Beethovenfest Bonn, Ludwigsburg Festival, Bodensee Festival (Germany), the Europalia Russia Festival in Belgium and repeatedly in the Music Festival Crescendo in Moscow, St. Petersburg, Yekaterinburg and Kaliningrad, the Festival de La Roque-d'Anthéron international piano competition, and La Folle Journée in France, Spain and Japan.  The Russian edition of La Folle Journee takes place in Sverdlovsk Philharmonic in Yekaterinburg since 2015. Maestro Valery Gergiev invited the Ural Philharmonic Orchestra to perform at the opening of the Mariinsky Theatre’s new concert hall in 2007, under his direction.  Since then, the Ural Philharmonic Orchestra presents its own season concert series at the Mariinsky Theatre.

Principal conductors   
 Dmitry Liss (1995–present)

External links 
 Home page
 Facebook
 Instagram

Russian symphony orchestras
Musical groups established in 1936